Salt N' Pepper is a 2011 Indian Malayalam-language romantic comedy film directed by Aashiq Abu and produced for Lucsam Creations. The film stars Lal, Asif Ali, Shwetha Menon, and Mythili in the lead roles, while Baburaj and Vijayaraghavan play supporting roles.

The film follows the love stories of two couples. The main characters are: Kalidasan, an archaeologist; Maya, a dubbing artist; Meenakshi, an IELTS student; Manu, a happy-go-lucky management graduate; and Babu, Kalidasan's cook. Food plays an important role in the story, and the tagline of the film is ഒരു ദോശ ഉണ്ടാക്കിയ കഥ -  oru Dosa undaākkiya kadha ("A story made by Dosa", or "A story of making a Dosa").

The film has an original score by Bijibal, with three songs composed by Bijibal and the song "Aanakkallan" written and sung by Malayalam rock band Avial. The film was produced by Lucsam Cinema and released by Lal. Principal production started on 3 January 2011 and the film was released in theatres on 8 July 2011 to positive reviews and good initial viewing figures. It is widely regarded as one of the defining movies of the Malayalam New Wave.

Salt N' Pepper's Kannada, Tamil, Telugu, and Hindi remake rights have been bought by actor–director Prakash Raj. It was remade in Tamil as Un Samayal Arayil and shot simultaneously in Telugu and Kannada as Ulavacharu Biriyani and Oggarane, respectively. Prakash Raj directed the remakes and appeared in the lead role, playing Lal's character, while Sneha took on the role of Shweta Menon's character. Prakash is directing a Hindi remake titled Tadka. In 2019, Baburaj announced the shooting of a sequel titled Black Coffee, written and directed by him, and the movie was released on 19 February 2021.

Plot
Kalidasan works in the state archaeological department in Trivandrum and is a food lover. His only companion is his cook, Babu. Manu Raghav is Kalidasan's nephew, who comes to stay with him, while looking for a job. Kalidasan has a normal life until he gets a mis-dialled phone call from Maya, a dubbing artist living with her friend Meenakshi. Maya rings to order a special dosa (named "Thattil Kutty Dosa" in the film) from a restaurant, but gets Kalidasan instead. Their conversations do not go well at first, but a long-distance romance develops due to their common interest—cooking and food. Kalidasan is a born gourmet while Maya is indulging in culinary activities in memory of her deceased mother. Kalidasan starts to let Maya into the secrets of baking with a multilayered cake called "Joan's Rainbow".

Kalidasan and Maya both get the jitters before their first face-to-face meeting, as each becomes conscious of their own physical appearances, and both decide to send younger and better-looking substitutes instead, Manu and Meenakshi. When they meet, neither Manu nor Meenakshi realise that the other person is a substitute, since they introduce themselves as Kalidasan and Maya, respectively. Manu thinks that Kalidasan is actually in love with Meenakshi, while Meenakshi thinks that Maya is in love with Manu. They attempt to sabotage their older counterpart's relationship by telling Kalidasan and Maya that the person they met would be unsuitable for them. Kalidasan and Maya try to forget each other but fail, and they decide to call each other and meet anyway. Manu and Meenakshi, who by this time have started to develop feelings for each other, are dejected upon hearing this and decide to leave the city so that their older counterparts may have a good relationship. However, they discover the truth and each other's real identities during a chance encounter with a common acquaintance, Pooja, at the railway station. Thus Manu and Meenakshi call Kalidasan and Maya respectively and narrate all the incidents unknown to them. Kalidasan and Maya meet and their relationship begins. It is also shown that Manu and Meenakshi are in a relationship.

Cast and characters
 Lal as Kalathil Parambil Kalidasan, an archaeologist by profession and a food lover
 Asif Ali as Manu Raghav, a carefree youngster Asif Ali says, "It's the one character among all that I have  that's closest to my real-life persona."
 Shwetha Menon as Maya Krishnan, a single woman who works as a dubbing artist, also a "foodie"
 Mythili as Meenakshi, a bubbly young girl
 Baburaj as Babu, professional chef
 Vijayaraghavan as Balakrishnan, Kalidasan's friend and colleague
 Ahmed Sidhique as K. T. Mirash, Manu's friend and Meenakshi's teacher
 Kelu Mooppan as Mooppan, a tribal member whom Kalidasan brings to the city
 Kalpana as Mary, owner of the house where Maya and Meenakshi live
 Ambika Mohan as Itha, a regular customer at Mary's beauty parlour
 Archana Kavi as Pooja Nair, a girl whom Manu meets on a train
 Dileesh Pothan as a film director who tries to woo Maya
 Nandhu as Bhaskaran Nair, Pooja's father.
 Shine Tom Chacko as dubbing director
 Munshi Venu as Driving instructor
 Deepa Jayan as Serial actress

Themes
The film centres around food, and Aashiq Abu says: "For a society that is so fond of food, this genre of cinema has not been really explored much in Mollywood [Malayalam cinema], save for a few films. As a foodie, I was inspired to make a film centred on food when I came across this interesting script by Syam Pushkaran and Dileesh Nair."

The film often mentions Kerala cuisine. The title song, "Chembavu", features visuals of famous eateries across Kerala, such as the hotels Zain, Sagar, Paragon, Bombay, Buhari, Ananda Bhavan, Paradise, etc., as well as the unique three-metre-tea at a stall in Kumbalangi. It also portrays some Kerala specialities, such as Malabar Erachi pathiri. The lyrics of the song, written by Rafeeque Ahammed, also reference food.

The type of dosa specifically featured in the film, Thattil Kutty Dosa, is a local speciality. The relationship that develops between Kalidasan and Maya centres around the secrets of baking a multilayered cake known as Joan's Rainbow. The legend of this cake is described by Nita Sathyendran in The Hindu:  According to Abu, "Salt N' Pepper is meant to be a light-hearted entertainer; it's nothing serious—no big plots, no big twists—but plain old common sense and dollops of good ol' fun".

Production
The film was scripted by first-time writers Syam Pushkaran and Dileesh Nair, who said, "We had a one-liner ready and had approached a few directors. Although most of them liked what they heard, no one was willing to turn it into a movie. Then along came director Aashiq Abu of Daddy Cool fame. Lucky for us, Aashiq was looking for a light-hearted script, something to do before his next superstar film came through. He loved our one-liner enough to give us an advance on the spot and asked us to come back with a full-fledged script".

Salt N' Pepper is Aashiq Abu's second directorial venture. He was assisted by Abhilash S. Kumar. Technicians such as music director Bijibal, costume designer Sameera Saneesh, and V. Saajan had already collaborated with Aashiq in his first film, Daddy Cool. Cinematographer Shyju Kahlid had previously worked with Sameer Thahir on Daddy Cool. The film was produced by Mumbai-based Sadanandan Rangorath under the banner Name Lucsam Creations. Salt N' Pepper is their first project in the Malayalam film industry. Casting was finalised by December 2010. The original cast included Lal, Asif Ali, and Mythili. Nedumudi Venu was also reported to be cast during the original announcement.

Filming began eight months after the script was submitted and was launched on 5 January 2011 with a blessing held at BTH Sarovaram, Kochi. The ceremony also included film producer Naushad making a dosa onstage. Principal production for the film started on 3 January 2011 and it was shot entirely in Thiruvananthapuram.

Reception

Critical reception
The film received generally positive reviews, although some critics felt that certain scenes were far from convincing. In the Deccan Chronicle, Keerthy Ramachandran gave the film a three-star rating, writing, "This is a movie which weaves together taste, flavor and love to make an exquisite recipe for good cinema. A must watch for all gourmets, Salt N' Pepper is sweet humour interspersed in a light plot." She also described the film as "one of the most enjoyable films of recent times" and praised the cast performances, stating, "Shwetha Menon has acted brilliantly in the movie, proving that she has more to her than meets the eye. Lal has done complete justice to the role and appears likeable throughout the movie. But, the major share of credit should go to Baburaj – the stereotypical villain in Malayalam cinema. The role of Kalidasan's cook is a milestone in his career. Asif Ali and Mythili appear perfect in their roles. Actor Vijaya Raghavan in a cameo has made a commendable appearance."

Navamy Sudhish of The New Indian Express said, "A delightful addition to GenY fun flicks, Salt N' Pepper is an out-and-out entertainer. It gives two hoots to time-tested tricks and indulges you with a stimulating storyline and unfeigned artistry." He labelled the script "smart", Shyju Khalid's appearances "rich" and "peachy", and Bijibal's background score "superb". Sudhish also praised Abu, saying, "[his] narrative technique is unpretentious and devoid of any jaded gimmickry." Paresh C. Palicha of Rediff.com said, "Director Aashiq Abu has put together the right ingredients in his new film Salt N' Pepper and come up with quite an interesting dish" and that the film will meet the tastes of all who watch it. Veeyen of Nowrunning.com said, "Aashiq Abu and his team adhere to the golden rules of good cooking, and see to it that the griddle is all hot, before they gently spread out a light hearted Dosa story on it." The critic also praised the cast performances and Shyju Kahlid's cinematography. A reviewer from Sify.com said, "Salt N' Pepper may have its own share of shortcomings, but the sincerity with which it has been made is there to be seen in the film. It's a young film which oozes lots of freshness and it is enjoyable for people of all ages, especially if you love your food."

Box office
The film became a sleeper hit at the box office, completing a run of 100 days at many centres in Kerala. Its 100th-day celebration was held in Dubai on 27 October, with a concert by Avial. Bijibal also performed at the event.

The film collected  5.1 crore from fifty days of its release at the Kerala box office.

Soundtrack
The soundtrack to the film features three songs composed by Bijibal, two romantic melodies and a folk tune, as well as a song written by Malayalee rock band Avial, "Aanakkallan". It is the band's first release since their self-titled debut album, released in 2008. Avial singer Tony John says that "this song is more or less like a teaser for our second album". A music video, which appears at the end of the film, was also produced. John said: "We had loads of fun shooting the video, which is very kind of like what you would see in a music video rather than a filmy number". The video, directed by Aashiq Abu, is the second one for Avial after their first hit, "Nada Nada". It is also the first Avial track with John as the lead singer and Benjamin Isaac as the bass player.

Awards
Kerala State Film Awards
 Best Popular Film with Aesthetic value –  Sadanandan Rangorath
 Best Actress – Shwetha Menon

Asiavision Awards
 Best Family Movie
 Best Music Director – Bijibal
 Best Lyricist – Rafeeq Ahamed
 Best Second Actress – Shwetha Menon
 Best Comedy Artist – Baburaj
 Special Mention – Mythili

Asianet Film Awards 2011
 Best Star Pair – Asif Ali & Mythili

Vanita Film Awards 2011
 Best Music Director – Bijibal
 Best Comedy Artist – Baburaj
 Best Pair – Lal & Shwetha Menon

Mathrubhumi Film Awards 2011
 Best Path Breaking Movie of the Year

Amrita Film Awards
 Best Film

Sequel
A loose sequel, Black Coffee, was released on 19 February 2021.

References

External links
 

2011 films
2010s Malayalam-language films
Malayalam films remade in other languages
Cooking films
Indian romantic comedy films
Films about food and drink
Films shot in Thiruvananthapuram
Films set in Kerala
Films shot in Kerala
Films with screenplays by Syam Pushkaran
Films with screenplays by Dileesh Nair
Films directed by Aashiq Abu
2011 romantic comedy films